The Sălaș (also: Mălăești) is a left tributary of the river Strei in Romania. It discharges into the Strei in Ohaba de sub Piatră.

References

Rivers of Romania
Rivers of Hunedoara County